The term Apparatchik may refer to:

 Apparatchik, a functionary in the Soviet Union
 Apparatchik (fanzine), a fanzine
 Apparatjik, an electronic musical group